Cycas debaoensis is a plant species endemic to the Guangxi region of China. It grows in sunny locations at elevations of 700–1000 m. It is closely related to Cycas multipinnata.

Description
Cycas debaoensis has a trunk that shows up to 70 cm above ground. Leaves are tripinnate with spines along the rachis. Seeds are green, yellow, or brown, 3–4 cm across.

Distribution
Cycas debaoensis is found in:
Fuping Village 扶平村 in Debao County
near Dingye 定业乡 in Napo County
near Banshui 泮水乡 in Baise City
near Gula 谷拉乡 in Funing County

References

External links
Debao Cycad Conservation Project

debaoensis
Flora of China
Flora of Guangxi
Plants described in 1997